The Bangladesh Women's Super League (BWSL)  is women's top tier professional women's football league in Bangladesh. Founded in 2023, currently a total of 6 teams from across the country will participate in the league from 2022–2023 season.

History

Champions

Successful clubs by seasons

Stats and players

Seasonal statistics

Top scorers

References

Football in Bangladesh
Bangladesh Women's Football League seasons
2022–23 in Asian association football leagues
Women's football in Bangladesh
2022–23 domestic women's association football leagues